Planodema alboreticulata is a species of beetle in the family Cerambycidae. It was described by Stephan von Breuning in 1954. It is known from the Democratic Republic of the Congo.

References

Theocridini
Beetles described in 1954
Endemic fauna of the Democratic Republic of the Congo